Vicarage Meadows is a Site of Special Scientific Interest near Abergwesyn, Powys, Wales.

The  site, located close to the Nant Irfon National Nature Reserve, has unimproved acid grassland on which grow the small-white orchid, the fragrant orchid (Gymnadenia conopsea), the Greater Butterfly orchid (Platanthera chlorantha) and the Wood Bitter-vetch (Vicia orobus). The site is grazed by Exmoor ponies.

See also
List of Sites of Special Scientific Interest in Brecknock

References

External links
Vicarage Meadows Site of Special Scientific Interest - 'Your Special Site and its Future', Countryside Council for Wales
Brecknock Wildlife Trust - Vicarage Meadows Nature Reserve
NBN gateway for Vicarage Meadows, National Biodiversity Network

Sites of Special Scientific Interest in Brecknock
Meadows in Wales